Ciyun Temple is a Buddhist temple situated in Huai'an City, Jiangsu Province, China. Its original name is Ciyun Nunnery. It was established in 1615 CE.

History 
In 1656, during the Qing Dynasty, Shih Tsu Fu Lin called on the famous shaman Wukang Yu Lin, and let him live in Wanshan Hall. Due to their similar interests, they quickly became friends. They only regretted that they had not met sooner. After that, Fu Lin bestowed the name "Buddhist Monk Dajue" on Yu Lin, and later Yu Lin was elevated to "Universal and Benevolent Emperor's Teacher Dajue". In 1675, the aged emperor's teacher Yu Lin wandered alone. He stayed for the night in Ciyun Temple in Huai'an House and died there. Eventually, the temple got its new name "Ciyun Buddhist Temple" because of Yu Lin's arrival.

Present condition 
At present, the rebuilt Shanmen Hall has an inscription of "Ciyun Buddhist Temple" written by Kulapati Zhao Puchu, the chairman of the Buddhist Association of China. Hall of the Heavenly King, Tripitaka Hall and Hall of the Emperor's Teacher have been completely renovated. The original storehouses were reconstructed into the Holy Triad Hall, Ti-tsang Hall, Kwan-yin Hall, mediation abodes, a dining hall, and dormitories for monks. The rebuilt Ciyun Temple was officially opened to the public in 1994. Master Jueshun, with the other masters and kulapatis, has retaken Ciyun Street. The street has a square of more than 20 acres. They are planning to reconstruct the street to restore the resplendent original appearance of Ciyun Temple.

References 
Ciyun Buddhist Temple in Huai'an City
Ciyun Buddhist Temple

Buddhist temples in Huai'an
Religious organizations established in 1615
1615 establishments in China